Regan Charles Upshaw (born August 12, 1975) is a former American football defensive tackle who played in the National Football League (NFL) between 1996 and 2004.  He was selected by the Tampa Bay Buccaneers in the first round of the 1996 NFL Draft out of the University of California, Berkeley.

In high school, Upshaw played for Pittsburg High School (Pittsburg, California), helping defeat the previously undefeated De La Salle in the 1991 NCS championship game played at the Oakland Coliseum. The final score was 35-27. This was the last defeat De La Salle suffered before setting a national high school record of 151 straight victories.  Upshaw, who did not play football until his sophomore year at Pittsburg, was a Parade All-America as a senior. He chose the University of California and by his junior year was named All-American.

The Tampa Bay Buccaneers selected him with the 12th pick overall in the 1996 NFL draft. He later played for the Jacksonville Jaguars, Oakland Raiders, Washington Redskins, and New York Giants. He also appeared in Super Bowl XXXVII while a member of the Raiders during the 2002 season. The team went on to lose the game 48-21 to one of Upshaw's former teams, the Buccaneers.

References

External links
 

1975 births
Living people
American football defensive ends
Oakland Raiders players
Tampa Bay Buccaneers players
California Golden Bears football players
Washington Redskins players
Jacksonville Jaguars players
New York Giants players
People from Berrien Springs, Michigan
Players of American football from Michigan